Thomas Scully OMI ( May 1930 – 7 April 2020) was a Gaelic football manager, priest and schoolteacher. He managed the Offaly county team, where he was pivotal in establishing them as a rising side in the sport.

Biography
Scully was a native of Aharney in Tullamore. He had two brothers and six sisters: Ned, Michael, Nance (Hanlon), Mary (Garry), Rose (Cleary), Margaret (Henry), Lily (MacDonald) and Emily (Hanlon). All bar Emily predeceased him. He studied philosophy at UCD and theology at the Oblates Scholasticate in Piltown Co. Kilkenny.

During the 1960s, Scully trained the Belcamp College boarding school team in Dublin to three Leinster Schools' Football Championships. He led Offaly to the final of the 1968–69 National Football League (their first), the Leinster Senior Football Championship title (their third) and then to the 1969 All-Ireland Senior Football Championship Final (their first since 1961), having only taken over that year (though he would have trained any Offaly players living in Dublin).

Scully departed for South Africa in 1970 to teach mathematics in Johannesburg. However, apartheid did not suit him and he moved to England instead. While in England he lived in both London and Manchester. He there became involved in the Lancashire GAA. By 1988, Scully had become Director of the Irish Centre in London. He established a day centre for the elderly and encouraged the older Irish to mix with the older English and the older Europeans living there. In May that year, RTÉ's reporter Leo Enright was in Camden Town and Scully spoke to him on camera. He was selected as Offaly Person of the Year in 1989.

Later life
By 2018, Scully's eyesight had deteriorated. Based in later life in the House of Retreat in the Dublin suburb of Inchicore, Scully heard confessions and ministered to the sick. He died in Dublin of COVID-19 on the morning of 7 April. He was one month short of his 90th birthday. His death occurred at St James's Hospital. He had been in hospital for less than a week and had spoken over the phone during those final days.

References

1930 births
2020 deaths
Deaths from the COVID-19 pandemic in the Republic of Ireland
Gaelic football managers
Irish humanitarians
Irish expatriate sportspeople in England
Irish expatriates in South Africa
20th-century Irish Roman Catholic priests
Irish schoolteachers
Mathematics educators
People from Tullamore, County Offaly
Sportspeople from County Offaly
21st-century Irish Roman Catholic priests